Emilia Castañeda Martínez (born 7 November 1943) is a Spanish painter.

She was born in Madrid, but moved to Barcelona with her family as a child. She began training in 1956 at the academy of the painter Víctor Esteban Ripaux and at Escola de la Llotja in 1959 and Escuela Massana in 1969. By the 70s she had finished her studies and became a professional painter.

Her works focus on the nude, generally placed in an abstract and dreamlike background that include objects that offer clues to the story told by the central figures. Her work has been compared with that of modernists such as Gustav Klimt, Anglada Camarasa and with the French symbolist school. Some of her works have been rejected by art galleries due to their erotic themes.

References 

 Emilia Castañeda Martínez, Great Women Masters of Art, pages 455–460, by Jordi Vigué, 2002
Official website

1943 births
Living people
People from Barcelona
Spanish women painters